Body Sweats: The Uncensored Writings of Elsa von Freytag-Loringhoven is the first major English collection of poems by dadaist poet and artist Elsa von Freytag-Loringhoven (1874–1927), also known as "The Baroness". Published posthumously in 2011 by MIT Press, Body Sweats was edited by Elsa von Freytag-Loringhoven biographer Irene Gammel and poet and poetics scholar Suzanne Zelazo.

The collection fulfills the Baroness's desire to see her poetry published in a book, a project she began but did not achieve during her lifetime. Djuna Barnes, a close friend and editor, is credited for her work in protecting the von Freytag-Loringhoven manuscripts after the Baroness's death.

Beginning with an introduction to the poetic style and eccentric life of Elsa von Freytag-Loringhoven, the book goes on to showcase the poems of the Baroness, many previously unpublished. Body Sweats also includes images of the original handwritten manuscripts, themselves art objects. The poems are organized by theme: love and longing, embodiment, city and consumption, performing nature, philosophical contemplation, death and suicide, aesthetic consciousness, sonic poems, visual poems, as well as a section containing long poems and poetic criticism.

The majority of poems printed were obtained from the University of Maryland Library Elsa von Freytag-Loringhoven Papers, as well as the University of Wisconsin-Milwaukee Library's The Little Review Records.

Notes

References
 Freytag-Loringhoven, Elsa von. Body Sweats: The Uncensored Writings of Elsa von Freytag Loringhoven. Ed. Irene Gammel and Suzanne Zelazo. Cambridge, MA: MIT Press, 2011. 
 Gammel, Irene. Baroness Elsa: Gender, Dada, and Everyday Modernity. Cambridge, MA: MIT, 2002.

External links
MIT Press
Video of Body Sweats: The Uncensored Writings of Elsa von Freytag-Loringhoven launch in New York City

German poetry collections
2011 poetry books